The Moore-Jacobs House is a historic house at 500 North Main Street in Clarendon, Arkansas.  It is a single-story wood-frame structure, with a side-gable roof and an projecting entry pavilion with a pedimented gable supported by paired square columns.  Built in about 1870, this Greek Revival house is a testament to that style's enduring popularity in Arkansas.  It was moved across the street from its original location in 1931. It was also for many years home to Margaret Moore-Jacobs, known for her inspirational writings.

The house was listed on the National Register of Historic Places in 1983.

See also
National Register of Historic Places listings in Monroe County, Arkansas

References

Houses on the National Register of Historic Places in Arkansas
Greek Revival houses in Arkansas
Houses completed in 1870
Houses in Monroe County, Arkansas
National Register of Historic Places in Monroe County, Arkansas